Leopold Feist (January 3, 1869, New York City – June 21, 1930, Mount Vernon, New York), in 1897 founded and ran a music publishing firm bearing his name. In the 1920s, at the height of the golden age of popular music, his firm was among the seven largest publishers of popular music in the world. Leo Feist, Inc., ran until 1934.

Leo Feist, Inc. 

Feist marketed his publications very aggressively, even by Tin Pan Alley standards. He maintained offices in most major cities, each with a regional manager (in Boston, for instance, his delegate was Billy Lang). Favored employees were rewarded with corporate largesse; in 1914, for instance, selected managers gathered in Atlantic City, where it was said that "money flowed like water."

As evidence of the size of his firm, Leo Feist, Inc., was one of seven defendants named in a 1920 Sherman antitrust suit brought by the US Justice Department for controlling 80% of the music publishing business. The 7 were Consolidated Music Corporation, Irving Berlin, Inc., Leo Feist, Inc., T.B. Harms & Francis, Day & Hunter, Inc., Shapiro, Bernstein & Co., Inc., Waterson, Berlin & Snyder, Inc., and M. Witmark & Sons, Inc.

"My Blue Heaven," written by Walter Donaldson (music) in collaboration with George Whiting (lyrics), became the biggest song in the history of Leo Feist, Inc.  Gene Austin recorded it (Victor 20964), selling over five million copies, and Eddie Cantor plugged it in vaudeville and in the Ziegfeld Follies of 1927.  It sold over five million copies of sheet music.

In 1935, five years after the death of Leo Feist, Metro-Goldwyn-Mayer acquired a controlling interest in the capital stock of Leo Feist, Inc. In 1973, MGM sold Robbins, Feist, and Miller (known as Big 3) to United Artists. In 1981, MGM acquired UA and formed MGM/UA Communications Co. In 1983, MGM/UA sold its music publishing business to CBS Records. CBS then sold the print music arm, Big 3 Music, to Columbia Pictures.

Personal life 
Leopold Feist was the brother of Felix F. Feist (Jul 15, 1883 – Apr 15, 1936), a sales executive at Metro-Goldwyn-Mayer. His nephew was Felix Ellison Feist (Feb 28, 1910 – Sep 2, 1965), a film and television director. His great-nephew was fantasy author Raymond E. Feist.

In a pseudo-secret ceremony, Feist married Bessie Meyer on June 24, 1904. They had three children: Leonard S. Feist (1911–1996), Nathan Feist (1905–1965), and Milton Feist (1907–1975).

Leonard was a music publisher, copyright expert, and advocate for the music publishing industry; Nathan was a publisher and advertising executive; and Milton was a rabbi, scholar, teacher, publisher, and translator of opera.

References

External links 

 Leonard Feist papers, 1901–1991, New York Public Library

Categories for Leo Feist, Inc. 
 
 
 
 
 

Music publishers (people)
1869 births
1930 deaths